Taylor Morris Teaford (born June 18, 1935) is an American fugitive and suspected murderer who was added to the FBI Ten Most Wanted Fugitives list in 1968.

Early life
Teaford was born in 1935 at North Fork, California and was raised by his grandmother Pearl due to his parents' separation. Of American Indian descent, he was afflicted with polio at the age of 13 which caused him to walk with a limp to his right leg.

Criminal career

Teaford dropped out of school in the ninth grade; his criminal record began as a juvenile, when he was charged with theft and reckless driving at the Fresno County Juvenile Court. 

He was also imprisoned in 1957 on a rape charge, and in 1955 for burglary. In July 1967, Teaford was sought in a manhunt after the shooting death of his grandmother, Pearl in North Fork, which also wounded his sister and one other person. He was added to the FBI Ten Most Wanted Fugitives list on May 10, 1968, on a warrant for unlawful flight to avoid prosecution.

Murder of the Alameda County Jane Doe

In 1972, Teaford was charged with the murder of an unidentified woman found dead from strangulation and blunt force trauma in an Oakland, California hotel room on October 2, 1969.

FBI wanted poster
Teaford was described by the FBI on his wanted poster to be "strong physically", proficient at firearms use, and to have an "explosive" temper. He was also said to drink alcohol heavily and use narcotics. He was removed from the list in 1972 when federal process against him was dismissed.

See also
List of fugitives from justice who disappeared

References

1935 births
20th-century American criminals
Possibly living people
FBI Ten Most Wanted Fugitives
Criminals from California
American rapists